Onur Büyüktopçu (born 24 April 1982) is a Turkish actor, cast director and manager. He is known for his roles in Kiralık Aşk, Memleket Hikayeleri and Hürmüz Gelin.

Life and career 
Onur Büyüktopçu was born on 24 April 1982 in Istanbul. His father is from Çankırı, while his mother is an Albanian immigrant. He lived in İzmir until the age of eighteen and finished his education there. To learn a foreign and take theater lessons, Büyüktopçu went to England and was educated at the Academy of Creative Training Brighton Act London Film Academy. He made his acting debut in 2003 portraying the character of Yusuf on the TV series Lise Defteri.

He later had guest roles in the series Yabancı Damat and Doktorlar. In 2010, he joined the cast of Güz Gülleri. Between 2015 and 2017, he portrayed the character of Koray on the TV series Kiralık Aşk. He then appeared as a presenter on TV8's cooking program  Yemekteyiz. In 2019, he presented the Damat Bayıldı contest on Show TV. In May 2020, he began presenting the Çarkıfelek game show on Kanal D. Aside of his career in cinema and television, he also works as a cast director, manager and theater actor.

Filmography

References

External links 
 
Onur Büyüktopçu on TVTurca

1982 births
Male actors from Istanbul
Turkish male television actors
Turkish male film actors
Living people
21st-century Turkish male actors